Afonso Augusto Moreira Pena Júnior (25 December 1879 – 12 April 1968) was a Brazilian lawyer, professor, politician and essayist.

Biography 
Júnior was born in Santa Bárbara, Minas Gerais, on 25 December 1879. He was the son of former president Afonso Pena, and Maria Guilhermina de Oliveira Pena. He did his primary studies in Ouro Preto and studied humanities at the Colégio do Caraça. He took preparatory exams at the Ginásio de Barbacena. He graduated from the Faculty of Law of Belo Horizonte in 1902. In his youth, he belonged to literary groups in Belo Horizonte, with suggestive symbolic names like Jardineiros do Ideal and Cavaleiros do Luar and indulged in symbolist poetry.

He devoted himself to teaching and politics. He was professor of law at the Faculty of Law of Belo Horizonte and he also served as Secretary of the Interior of the State of Minas Gerais. Elected state deputy in two legislatures (1902–1907 and 1908–1912), he resigned to dedicate himself to the Campanha civilista of 1910, fighting against the candidacy of Hermes da Fonseca. 

Invited by President Artur Bernardes, he returned to the State Chamber as leader. Later he was a legal consultant for the Bank of Brazil; Professor of Civil Law at the Faculty of Law of the Catholic University of Rio de Janeiro; Judge of the Superior Court of Electoral Justice and Minister of Justice. He was a member of the Brazilian Institute of Education, Science and Culture and rector of the University of the Federal District.

He wrote the book A Arte de Furtar e seu autor, the result of lengthy research on Antonio de Sousa Macedo. Studying the enigma of the authorship of Cartas Chilenas, he wrote the preface to Professor Rodrigues Lapa's book, reaching the conclusion that the author was Tomás Antônio Gonzaga. He wrote several texts and essays for the magazine Digesto Econômico from São Paulo.

He was the fourth occupant of Chair 7 of the Brazilian Academy of Letters, to which he was elected on 22 May 1947, succeeding Afrânio Peixoto. He was received on 14 August 1948, by Academician Alceu Amoroso Lima. Afonso Pena Júnior died in Rio de Janeiro on 12 April 1968.

References

Brazilian writers
1879 births
1968 deaths